Laolong Town is a settlement located in the northwestern part of Longchuan County, in northwestern Guangdong Province in China. Around 120,000 people live in Laolong town, which is the economic, political and transportation hub of the county. The town covers over 15 square kilometers. Laolong is surrounded on three sides by mountains and faces the East River in the west.

History

In ancient China, Laolong was a trading and market town. During the Qing dynasty, it was a fort defended tenaciously by Zhao Tuo .

The name of the town was changed to different Chinese characters, although the pronunciation did not change.

The government of Longchuan County was based in Laolong town for 65 years.

Language and Culture

The most widespread dialect in Laolong is a regional variation of Hakka Chinese. Historically, the Shan'ge (also called Hakka hill songs) were popular in Laolong and older men and women would walk along the river singing in the mornings. The Shan'ge are often sung in duet with improvised lyrics.

Economy

The economy of Laolong has developed rapidly in recent years. In 2004, the GDP of Laolong was about RMB 6.13 billion. This includes industrial output of about 3.33 billion, agricultural output of about RMB751 million and tertiary industry of about RMB 2.73 billion. Fiscal revenue is about RMB 461 million, while the rural per capita net income (PCNIRH) is about 5586 yuan.

Transport

As the center of Longchuan County, the transportation system is more extensive than other nearby towns. Major roads include the China National Highway 205 (G205) and Guangdong Provincial Highway 120 (S120). The Beijing–Kowloon, Guangzhou–Meizhou–Shantou and Zhangping–Longchuan railways intersect in Longchuan, making it an important railway hub for the Lingnan region.

Three rail stations and three public transit bus routes operate in Laolong.

Population
The population of Laolong town is about 120,000.

References

Towns in Guangdong
Heyuan